Methanol dehydrogenase (cytochrome c) (methanol dehydrogenase, MDH) is an enzyme with systematic name methanol:cytochrome c oxidoreductase. This enzyme catalyses the following chemical reaction

 a primary alcohol + 2 ferricytochrome cL  an aldehyde + 2 ferrocytochrome cL + 2 H+

A periplasmic quinoprotein alcohol dehydrogenase is only present in methylotrophic bacteria.

References

External links 
 

EC 1.1.2
Dehydrogenase (cytochrome c)